Kirin Chavanwong (born 1931) is a Thai basketball player. He competed in the men's tournament at the 1956 Summer Olympics.

References

1931 births
Possibly living people
Kirin Chavanwong
Kirin Chavanwong
Basketball players at the 1956 Summer Olympics
Place of birth missing (living people)